In alchemy, fixation is a process by which a previously volatile substance is "transformed" into a form (often solid) that is not affected by fire. It separates the substance or object and puts it back in the same or different shape at a subatomic level.

Fixation is sometimes listed as one of the processes required for transformation of a substance, or completion of the alchemical magnum opus.

See also 
 Atomic layer deposition
 Mond process
 Thermal decomposition

Alchemical processes